The inípi ceremony (Lakota: iní- from inyan, rock + -pi, makes the term plural, 'rocks'), a type of sweat lodge, is a purification ceremony of the Lakota people. It is one of the Seven Sacred Ceremonies of the Lakota people, which has been passed down through the generations of Lakota.

Those who have inherited and maintained these traditions have issued statements about the standards to be observed in the inípi. In the March 2003 meeting it was agreed among the spiritual leaders and Bundle Keepers of the Lakota, Dakota, Nakota, Cheyenne and Arapaho Nations that:

I-ni-pi (Purification Ceremony): Those that run this sacred rite should be able to communicate with Tun-ca-s'i-la (our Sacred Grandfathers) in their Native Plains tongue. They should also have earned this rite by completing Han-ble-c'i-ya and the four days and four years of the Wi-wanyang wa-c'i-pi.

This also follows upon the decisions made at the Lakota Summit V, an international gathering of US and Canadian Lakota, Dakota and Nakota Nations, where about 500 representatives from 40 different tribes and bands of the Lakota unanimously passed a "Declaration of War Against Exploiters of Lakota Spirituality". The declaration was unanimously passed on June 10, 1993. Among other things, it specifies that these ceremonies are only for those of the Lakota, Dakota and Nakota Nations.

One concern about outsiders trying to perform these ceremonies is not only does it go against the express wishes of the traditional healers who have inherited these ceremonies, but also that those who do not know how to do them properly have in some cases caused dehydration and heat stroke, resulting in injury and even deaths.

See also 
 Cultural appropriation
 Plastic shaman
 Sweat lodge

References 

Indigenous architecture
Lakota culture
Lakota words and phrases
Native American religion
Religious places of the indigenous peoples of North America
Ritual purification